Below are the full rosters, including the coaching staffs, of the teams of National Pro Fastpitch, the only professional women's softball league in the United States as of 2018.
, the roster maximum is 26 athletes per team. Previously, all teams were allowed a minimum of 18 and up to 23 players on their roster.

Per Commissioner Cheri Kempf's tweet, NPF contracts expire in February, therefore the extension of a contract "through 2018" means the player is only contracted to play through the 2017 season, with the contract expiring the following February.  The final year listed for a player on the rosters below is the final season the player is under contract, with expiration in the following year's February.

Teams retain exclusive signing rights with draftees for two seasons.

Aussie Peppers

Beijing Shougang Eagles

Canadian Wild

Chicago Bandits

Cleveland Comets

See also
 List of NCAA Division I softball programs

References

National Pro Fastpitch
National Pro Fastpitch